Car number plates in SFR Yugoslavia consisted of a two-letter district code that showed the place where the car carrying them was registered, followed by a red star and two groups of digits that could contain two or three letters, for example: BG 12-34, BG 123-45 or BG 123-456. The letter codes matched the municipalities of Yugoslavia:

Special plates 

 Trailer plates had the reverse format of the normal plates, starting with the digits and ending with the regional code.
 Diplomatic plates had yellow letters on black background. The vehicles were marked with an oval sticker with a mark CMD, CD or CC.
 Plates of vehicles and trailers belonging to the Yugoslav armed forces had the red star separated on the left side, together with a red JNA inscription.
 Temporary plates had RP (registrovano privremeno) on the place of the district code, followed by three or four digits, a vertical red band containing the year of registration and a numerical denotation of the republic where the vehicle was temporarily registered.
 Police plates had white letters on blue background and started with M (milicija).
 Agricultural plates had white letters on green background.
 Vehicles with exceptional dimensions received red plates with white letters.

Successor state plates 
 Vehicle registration plates of Bosnia and Herzegovina
 Vehicle registration plates of Croatia
 Vehicle registration plates of Kosovo
 Vehicle registration plates of Montenegro
 Vehicle registration plates of North Macedonia
 Vehicle registration plates of Serbia
 Vehicle registration plates of Slovenia

References

Yugoslavia
Socialist Federal Republic of Yugoslavia
Yugoslavia-related lists
Transport in Yugoslavia